The Apprentice 4 can refer to:

The Apprentice (UK Series 4)
The Apprentice (US Season 4)